Pisanka may refer to:

 Pisanka (Polish), richly ornamented decorated chicken, goose, or duck eggs
 Pisanka (river), a river in Perm Krai, Russia, tributary to Vishera

See also 
 Pysanka